Hanson Musical Instruments, LTD is a manufacturer of electric guitars and electronics/pickups for electric guitars and basses. The company is based in Chicago, Illinois, USA, founded in 2005 by John and Bo Pirruccello. The company is the current owner of the Lakland brand of basses.

Product range
The company's product range includes the Chicagoan, a mini-humbucker guitar designed to resemble the Epiphone Riviera and the Gretsch White Falcon, the Cigno, supporting P-90 pickups, and the three-humbucker Firenze.

Notable users
Richie Furay played a Hanson Chicagoan ST during the 2011 Buffalo Springfield reunion tour.

Anne McCue
 
Paul Cotton of Poco and Illinois Speed Press
 
Alejandro Escovedo
 
Pat Sansone of Wilco
 
Charlie Sexton
 
Nicholas Tremulis
 
Ivan Julian
 
Blondie Chaplin
 
Hubert Sumlin

References

External links
 Hanson Guitars
 Hanson Pickups

Guitar manufacturing companies of the United States
Musical instrument manufacturing companies based in Chicago